The Rohini West metro station is located on the Red Line of the Delhi Metro. It is an elevated station and is located in Sector 6 & Sector 10 of Rohini in Delhi, India. The station was inaugurated on 31 March 2004. The station is located just in front of Unity One Mall, Rohini. To provide seamless connection, the mall and the station have been integrated with Skywalk between the station building and the mall near gate no. 1 which allows travellers to directly enter the mall without exiting through the exit gates and vice versa.

Station layout

See also
List of Delhi Metro stations
Transport in Delhi

References

External links

 Delhi Metro Rail Corporation Ltd. (Official site)

Delhi Metro stations
Railway stations opened in 2004
Railway stations in North West Delhi district
2004 establishments in Delhi